Csoma is the name of

 Csoma, Hungary, village in Somogy county, Hungary.
 Sándor Kőrösi Csoma, Hungarian explorer